Hällekis is a locality situated in Götene Municipality, Västra Götaland County, Sweden. It had 704 inhabitants in 2010 compared to 904 in 1960, a decline due to the closure of the main employer.

Location
The village is situated on the coast of Lake Vänern to the north of Mount Kinnekulle with a  ridge and large nature reserve.

History
A mill was established in the village in the 18th century. With the availability of limestone nearby this was developed into a cement plant purchased in 1913 by Skånska Cement, the mother company of AB Skånska Cementgjuteriet, now known as Skanska. The factory closed in 1979.

On the outskirts of the village is the manor Hönsäter of which the most famous owner was Swedish military commander Harald Stake (1598-1677). The current main building dates back to 1667 but was remodelled in 1807. The manor was previously owned by Skånska Cement but is now privately owned.

References

See also
Swedish version

Populated places in Västra Götaland County
Populated places in Götene Municipality